Mildred is an unincorporated community in Prairie County, Montana, United States. It was platted in 1908.

References

Unincorporated communities in Prairie County, Montana
Unincorporated communities in Montana